The Imperiali (or Imperiale) family is a princely noble family. It is one of the most important Italian families and was a key protagonist of European history among aristocratic families. Originating from the Republic of Genoa it was previously named Tartaro (10th century), and descends from the House of Ventimiglia. It was one of the most powerful families dominating the city's politics in the 17th and 18th century and owned a vast amount of land in Italy.

Titles 
The various titles of the Imperiali family acquired over years are the following:
 Grandees of Spain
 Princes of Francavilla (1639)
 Princes of Sant'Angelo dei Lombardi (1718)
 Princes of Montafia (1725)
 Princes of Castagneto (1789)
 Marquises of Latiano (1668)
 Marquises of Oyra (1572)
 Marquises of Livorno (1725)
 Marquises of Pianezza (1725)
 Marquises of Roatta (1725)
 Marquises of Casetelnuovo (1725)
 Marquises of Moretta (1725)
 Marquises of Dego (1725)
 Marquises of Cagna (1725)
 Marquises of Giusvalla (1725)
 Marquises of Piana nel Monferrato (1725)

Cardinals of the Catholic Church 
The Imperiali family possessed a strong presence in religion and had three cardinals:

Lorenzo Imperiali (1612-1673).

Giuseppe Renato Imperiali (1651-1737) participated in the papal enclave after the death of Pope Innocent X and was only one vote short of being elected pope.

Cosimo Imperiali (1685-1764): Born in Genoa, he was great-grand-nephew of Cardinal Lorenzo Imperiali, nephew of Cardinal Giuseppe Renato Imperiali, and cousin of Cardinal Giuseppe Spinelli. He was made cardinal in 1753. He participated in the Conclave of 1758, that elected Pope Clement XIII.

Historical Buildings

Palazzo Imperiali in Genova 

The palace was built in around 1560 for Giovan Vicenzo Imperiale.

Villa Imperiali in Genova 

The villa was purchased by the Imperiali family from the Catteneo. Its gardens are currently open to the public and the building is host to the communal library known as "Lercari".

Castle of Francavilla Fontana 

Originally built in 1455 by Giovanni Antonio del Balzo Orsini. It was purchased by the Imperiali family from S. Carlo Borromeo, from the House of Borromeo, in the 16th century for 40,000 ounces of gold.

Castle Imperiali di Villa Castelli 

The castle was purchased by the Imperiali in the 17th century from the Orsini family.

Castello di Sant'Angelo dei Lombardi 

The building dates back to the 10th century. Major works were carried out by the Caracciolo family in the 17th century and by Prince Placido Imperiale after purchasing the building. The 1980 Irpinia earthquake severely damaged the building's structure.

Palazzo Imperiali di Latiano

Palazzo Imperiali-Filotico di Manduria

Palazzo Imperiali a Avetrana

Palazzo Imperiali a Salza Irpina

Villa Imperiali a Vicenza

Palazzo Cellamare

Torre dell'Antoglietta

Famous members 
Michele Imperiali Simeana, Prince of Montena and Francavilla (c1736-1782).
Davide Imperiale (1540-1612).
Giovanni Vincenzo Imperiale (1582-1648), politician. 
Giulio I Imperiale (1680-1738), first prince of Sant'Angelo dei Lombardi. 
Caterina Imperiale Lercari Pallavicini (fl. 1721), Neo-Latin poet and member of the Pontifical Academy of Arcadia.
The Marquis Guglielmo Imperiali (1858-1944), diplomat.
The Marquis Pierre Imperiali (1874-1940) (second cousin of Guglielmo), Belgian politician and senator, inventor of the Imperiali quota and of the Imperiali method.
Giovanni Imperiali d'Afflitto di Francavilla (1890-1983) Italian army general in the first and second world war. Descendant from the princely House d’Afflitto. 
Katie Boyle (1926–2018), daughter of the Marchese Demetrio Imperiali di Francavilla and his English wife, was a British television personality, game-show panelist and animal rights activist, very well known from the 1960s on.

References

Bibliography
Gian Domenico Oltrona Visconti, Imperialis Familia, Piacenza 1999.

External links
 The Castello Imperiali at Francavilla Fontana
 Genealogy of the Imperiali family from the Libro d'Oro of the Italian nobility
 The journey of Gian Vincenzo Imperiale in 1633
 History and biographies of the Imperiali of Genova and of the Sant'Angelo branch
 Poggio Imperiali